Jo Marie Payton (born August 3, 1950) is an American actress and singer. She is best known for her roles as Harriette Baines Winslow on the ABC/CBS sitcom Family Matters (1989–1998), a role she originated on its forerunner series Perfect Strangers. From 2001 to 2005, Payton provided the voice for Suga Mama Proud (Penny Proud's paternal grandmother) on Disney Channel's animated series The Proud Family and reprised the role in the 2005 TV Movie The Proud Family Movie and also on Disney+’s revival The Proud Family: Louder and Prouder. The role earned her an NAACP Image Award nomination in 2005. Payton also had recurring roles as the personal assistant to Gregory Hines' character, Ben Doucette (Will Truman's boss), during season two of Will & Grace (1999–2000).

Early life and education
Jo Marie Payton was born on August 3, 1950, in Miami, Florida. Sometime during her early teens, her family relocated to Opa-locka, Florida. Payton attended high school at North Dade Jr./ Sr. High School and later graduated from Miami Carol City Senior High School in 1968. Payton graduated from Albany State University.

Career
Payton's big break came when she was cast as Harriette Winslow, the elevator operator on the ABC sitcom Perfect Strangers, in 1987. Her performance was so well received by audiences that she was given her own sitcom, Family Matters, in 1989. Continuing her character Harriette Winslow from Perfect Strangers, she played a mother in a middle-class black family living in Chicago, Illinois. Payton left Family Matters partway through its final season, appearing for the last time on December 19, 1997, during increasing tension between her and star Jaleel White (the two nearly came to blows and had to be physically separated during Payton's penultimate episode). Harriette Winslow was played by Judyann Elder in the show's remaining eight episodes.

In 2002, Payton appeared on the "TV Moms" episode of the Anne Robinson version of The Weakest Link, and was the third one voted off. In 2003, Payton and her daughter appeared on a Mother's Day episode of Lingo, playing against fellow TV mom Meredith Baxter and her daughter. Baxter and her daughter won. In 2005, Jo Marie Payton provided the voice of Suga Mama in The Proud Family Movie. Her other television credits include Desperate Housewives, Reba, Girlfriends, Wanda at Large, Judging Amy, The Parkers, Will & Grace, The Hughleys, 7th Heaven, Moesha, The Jamie Foxx Show, 227, Silver Spoons, Small Wonder and The New Odd Couple. She also appeared in the Canadian TV miniseries The Rev as Mama.

In 2005, Payton co-hosted the 15th Annual NAACP Theatre Awards with Glynn Turman. In August 2009, Payton appeared on Meet the Browns as Shirley Van Owen. Payton hosted her own show on the Hometeam Network, Second Chance with Jomarie Payton. In 2012, Payton was in the GMC TV movie special From This Day Forward.

Other ventures
In 2004, in an effort to help raise funds for Virginia Union University, Payton wrote letters to alumni urging them to donate money in amounts from $18.65 to $186,500, in honor of the University's founding date of 1865. Payton also continued to donate, host charitable events, and support her alma mater of Albany State University while also continuing her education and making a successful career.

Personal life
Payton is a member of the Alpha Kappa Alpha sorority. In 1999, she released a jazz album, Southern Shadows. Payton has been married four times and divorced three times. Her first marriage lasted from 1980 to 1987, and was to Marc France with whom she has a daughter, Chantale France, born in 1984. From April 17, 1993 until 1998, Payton was married to Rodney Noble. Shortly after divorcing Noble, Payton married Landrus Clark in 1998; they divorced in 2004. Payton has been married to Leonard Downs since 2007.

Filmography

Film

Television

References

External links
 

1950 births
African-American actresses
Living people
American television actresses
American voice actresses
20th-century American actresses
21st-century American actresses
People from Albany, Georgia
Actresses from Florida
Actresses from Georgia (U.S. state)
Albany State University alumni
20th-century African-American women
20th-century African-American people
21st-century African-American women
21st-century African-American people